Pelletier's litter skink (Caledoniscincus pelletieri) is a species of lizard in the family Scincidae. It is endemic to New Caledonia.

References

Caledoniscincus
Skinks of New Caledonia
Endemic fauna of New Caledonia
Reptiles described in 2014
Taxa named by Ross Allen Sadlier
Taxa named by Anthony Whitaker
Taxa named by Perry L. Wood
Taxa named by Aaron M. Bauer